Brackley is a market town and civil parish in West Northamptonshire, England, bordering Oxfordshire and Buckinghamshire,  from Oxford and  from Northampton. Historically a market town based on the wool and lace trade, it was built on the intersecting trade routes between London, Birmingham, the Midlands, Cambridge and Oxford. Brackley is close to Silverstone and home to the Mercedes AMG Petronas F1 Team.

History
The place-name 'Brackley' is first attested in the Domesday Book of 1086, where it appears as Brachelai. It appears as  Brackelea in 1173 and as Brackeley in 1230 in the Pipe Rolls. The name means 'Bracca's glade or clearing'. Brackley was held in 1086 by Earl Alberic, after which it passed to the Earl of Leicester, and to the families of De Quincy and Roland.

In the 11th and 12th centuries Brackley was in the Hundred of Odboldistow and in the Manor of Halse. Richard I (The Lionheart) named five official sites for jousting tournaments so that such events could not be used as local wars, and Brackley was one of these. The tournament site is believed to be to the south of the castle where the A422 now passes.

The town was the site of an important meeting between the barons and representatives of the King in 1215, the year of Magna Carta. Magna Carta required King John to proclaim rights, respect laws and accept that the King's wishes were subject to law. It explicitly protected certain rights of the King's subjects, whether freemen, serfs, slaves or prisoners—most notably allowing appeal against unlawful imprisonment. King John and the barons were to have signed Magna Carta at Brackley Castle, but they eventually did so at Runnymede.

Market day was on Sundays until 1218, when it was changed to Wednesdays. It is now on Friday mornings.

The Tudor antiquary John Leland visited Brackley, where he learned 'a Lord of the Towne' named Neville had (at an uncertain point in the past) had the parish vicar murdered. This he had done by having the man buried alive. The writer Daniel Codd observed that in the grounds of St Peter's Church, a human-shaped stone effigy is sometimes pointed out as being connected with the event.

In 1597 the town was incorporated by Elizabeth I. It had a mayor, six aldermen and 26 burgesses.

In 1602, the metaphysical poet John Donne was elected as Member of Parliament for the constituency of Brackley.

Brackley used to be known for wool and lace-making.

It had 20 houses in the 18th century. In August 1882 the Brackley Lawn Tennis Club organised the Brackley LTC Tournament, as part of the Brackley Show.

In 1901 the population of the town was 2,467.

Brackley Poor Law Union
Brackley used the poor house at Culworth until 1834, when Parliament passed the Poor Law Amendment Act and as a result Brackley Poor Law Union was founded. A workhouse for 250 people was built in 1836, southwest of the town on Banbury Road. It was demolished in the 1930s.

Notable buildings

Castle
Brackley Castle was built soon after 1086. Its earthwork remains lie between Hinton Road and Tesco. Archaeological excavation has revealed evidence of a ditch defining the perimeter of the bailey. Two fishponds originally lay outside the ditch but have subsequently been infilled – however south of St. James Lake may have formed a part of this. Brackley Castle may have gone out of use in 1147. It was destroyed between 1173 (when the then lord of the manor, the Earl of Leicester, Robert le Blancmain, fell out with Henry II) and 1217 (when the Earl of Winchester, Blancmain's heir, was on the losing side against Henry III during the First Barons' War. The site was later granted to the Hospital of SS. James and John.

Parish church
The oldest part of the Church of England parish church of Saint Peter at the eastern end of the town centre is an 11th-century Norman south doorway. Both the four-bay arcade of the south aisle and the west tower with its niches containing seated statues were added in the 13th century. Next the chancel was rebuilt, probably late in the 13th century. The north arcade and the windows in both the north and south aisles were probably added early in the 14th century, about the same time as the Decorated Gothic chapel was added to the chancel.

Medieval hospitals
In about 1150 Robert de Beaumont, 2nd Earl of Leicester founded the Hospital of St. James and St. John. Its master was a priest, assisted by a number of religious brothers. Its duties included providing accommodation and care for poor travellers. In the 15th century there were complaints that successive masters were absentees, holding other livings at the same time as being in charge of the hospital. The hospital was closed in 1423 for maladministration but re-established in 1425. In 1449 a master was appointed who seems to have continued the practice of non-residence while holding parish livings elsewhere. In 1484 the patron, Viscount Lovell granted control of the hospital to William Waynflete, Bishop of Winchester, citing its failure to give hospitality and alms.

Waynflete had founded Magdalen College, Oxford in 1458 and Magdalen College School, Oxford in 1480. He made the former hospital part of their property and by 1548 it was Magdalen College School, Brackley. St James' chapel became the school chapel, in which use it remains today. It is the oldest building in Great Britain in continuous use by a school. The oldest part of the chapel is the west doorway, which is late Norman. Most of its windows are slightly later, being Early English Gothic lancet windows. The trio of stepped lancets above the west doorway are late 13th century. The Gothic Revival architect Charles Buckeridge restored the chapel in 1869–70.

The Hospital of St. Leonard was a smaller institution, founded to care for lepers. It was ½ mile (800 m) from SS. James and John, apparently on the northern edge of Brackley. It was in existence by 1280. After 1417 it shared the same master as SS. James and John and thereafter there is no separate record of St. Leonard's, so the larger hospital may have taken it over. No buildings of St. Leonard's hospital have survived.

Secular buildings

The almshouses were founded in 1633 by Sir Thomas Crewe of Steane. They have one storey plus attic dormers. They were originally six houses but by 1973 they had been converted into four apartments.

Brackley Manor House was also a 17th-century Jacobean building that also originally had one storey plus attic dormers. In 1875–78 the Earl of Ellesmere had it rebuilt on a larger scale, in the same style but retaining only the doorway and one window of the original building. It is now Winchester House School, a coeducational preparatory school for children aged from 3–13. It used to be a Woodard School.

Brackley Town Hall is Georgian, built in 1706 by the 4th Earl of Bridgewater. The ground floor was originally open but has since been enclosed. Market Place and Bridge Street feature number of other early 18th-century houses and inns, mostly of brick and in several cases combining red and blue bricks in a chequer pattern.

The town park belongs to the National Trust and hosts the Folk in the Park festival.

Transport

Roads and buses
Brackley is close to the A43 road, which now bypasses the town, linking it to Towcester and Northampton to the north-east and the M40 motorway to the west. The A422 links it to Banbury and Buckingham.

The town has numerous bus services and is connected to major towns and cities including Banbury (499, 500), Bicester (505), Buckingham, Towcester, Oxford and Northampton (currently 88) In 2003 the X38 Oxford-Northampton express service became the X6 with the introduction of the 88 to serve villages en route to Northampton (such as Towcester, Blisworth and Milton Malsor). In September 2007, Stagecoach Midlands' Oxford-Brackley-Towcester-Northampton services were reduced with the merging of the 88 and X6 as route X88. In September 2011 the 88 service covering the Northampton to Oxford route, was replaced by the 8. The route of which starts at Northampton and now terminates at Bicester. After 2016, the 8 was renumbered once again to 88 with timetable changes. A few months later, the 88 was further reduced only running between Northampton and Silverstone, with one off-peak journey numbered X88 and terminating at Brackley Tesco. In November 2017 the reintroduction of an almost hourly route 88 to Northampton. Also using the same vehicle and driver a brand new hourly service X91 has been introduced going to Milton Keynes. The financial support for both of these come from "Section 106" money from house builders required to improve local amenities. These services replace the X88 buses which had previously run in peak times to Northampton.

Railways

A bus service links Brackley town centre to Banbury station. Brackley had two railway stations but these were closed in the 1960s.

The London and North Western Railway operated the line from the beginning and absorbed the Buckinghamshire Railway Company in 1879. British Railways withdrew passenger trains from the line through Brackley Town station in January 1961 and closed the line to freight in 1966.

British Railways withdrew passenger trains from the line through Brackley Central in September 1966. Brackley Viaduct was demolished in sections early in 1978.

This would have Brackley Central railway station reopen with direct services to London,  and Rugby. However, the Department for Transport has chosen part of the former Great Central route north-west of Brackley as part of the new High Speed 2 line between London and Birmingham. A station at Brackley is not currently proposed.

Industry
Brackley is near the Silverstone motor racing circuit, and has some industry related to Formula One racing, notably Mercedes AMG Petronas F1 Team (formerly Brawn GP, Honda, British American Racing and Tyrrell) which is based in the town, and the Aston Martin F1 team which operates a wind tunnel on the former site of the north railway station yard. On the east outskirts of the town was H. Bronnley & Co., makers of hand-made soaps who hold Royal Warrants of Appointment for supplying Queen Elizabeth II and King Charles III.

Schools
Brackley has four primary schools: Bracken Leas, Southfield Primary Academy, The Radstone Primary School and Brackley Junior School. The town also has Waynflete Infants' School, most of whose pupils progress to Brackley Church of England Junior School. There is a private pre-prep/prep school for 3- to 13-year-olds, Winchester House. Magdalen College School, Brackley is the comprehensive secondary school for the town and surrounding villages.

Morris dancing
The Brackley Morris Men are one of only seven 'traditional Cotswold' sides remaining in England, and the only one to survive in Northamptonshire. Their history dates back to the 1600s when a solid silver communion plate was given to the parish. The plate which is still in the possession of St Peter's Church is dated 1623, and is inscribed with the names of seven men, whom local folklore believes to have been the Morris dancers. In 1725 the men were paid half a guinea to dance at the Whitsun Ale at Aynho House. In 1766 their 'Squire' was arrested in Oxford for his insolence and committed to Bridewell as a vagrant. In 1866 an article in the Oxford Chronicle reported on their performance in Banbury, describing their 'many coloured ribbons and other gaudy finery', and the 'witless buffoonery' of their 'fool'. The side still performs today.

Sports and leisure
Brackley cricket Club run 2 Saturday Teams and a Midweek Team as well as a Kwik Cricket and Junior Teams. They play in the Cherwell Cricket League and play at Brackley Cricket Club Ground. 

Brackley Squash Club, silver clubmark accreditation, established 39 years has a thriving 230 members plus with 4 teams men's, ladies, junior sections and 2019 Division 1 and County Champions of the Oxfordshire district, a first time ever in the club's history for Division 1. 
www.brackleysquash.co.uk.
2016 Northamptonshire Sport "Community club of the year".
2017 ENGLAND Squash "venue of the year".

Brackley Town Football Club, known as the Saints, play in National League North. Its finest season was in 2013–14 when it reached the FA Cup Second Round having beaten League One side Gillingham 1–0 in a First round replay following a 1–1 draw. Brackley Town's ground is St James Park. They won the FA Trophy in 2018, this being the first time in the club's history.

Brackley Rugby Union Football Club currently plays in the English Rugby Union Midland Division's Midlands 3 East (South) League. It hosts two senior sides and a number of teams in the junior section.

Brackley Sports Football Club first team plays in the North Bucks and District League Premier Division and its reserve team plays in the North Bucks and District League Intermediate Division. It also has a ladies' team that plays in the Northants Women's League.

Brackley Athletic Football Club is a junior football club affiliated with the Northamptonshire Football Association. It plays in three leagues: the under 7s – 10s are in the Milton Keynes & District Junior Sevens League, the under 11s – 16s are in the Milton Keynes & Border Counties League and the girls' team is in the Oxford Girls' Football League.

Brackley has a tennis club, a leisure centre and swimming pool, a martial arts academy and a badminton club.

South of the town is St. James lake, a balancing lake of almost  created in 1977. Fishing in the lake is managed by a local angling club. The lake is in a  wildlife park that is open to the public.

Brackley is also the home of German F1 team Mercedes AMG Petronas having had British team Brawn GP, who were bought out by Mercedes-Benz in 2009. Japanese team Honda F1 and British-American team BAR, who were bought out by Honda in 2006 were previously based in Brackley.

Closest cities, towns and villages

References

Further reading

External links

 
Towns in Northamptonshire
Civil parishes in Northamptonshire
Populated places on the River Great Ouse
West Northamptonshire District